William Ernest may refer to:
William Ernest, Grand Duke of Saxe-Weimar-Eisenach
William Ernest, Duke of Saxe-Weimar

See also
Wilhelm Ernst (1905–1952), German chess master